Randolph Mahaffey (born September 28, 1945) is an American former professional basketball player.

A 6'7" forward born in LaGrange, Georgia, Mahaffey played college basketball at Clemson University. Mahaffey was one of four brothers (Don, Ronnie and Richie are the others) who played for Clemson between 1959 and 1970. They marked the first time in Atlantic Coast Conference (ACC) history that four brothers played for the same program.

The Los Angeles Lakers selected him with the fourth pick of the second round of the 1967 NBA Draft (16th overall pick) and the Kentucky Colonels of the American Basketball Association also drafted him.  Mahaffey signed with the American Basketball Association's Colonels.

In his rookie season with the Colonels, Mahaffey scored over 1,000 points and was an ABA All-Star.

On December 30, 1968, the Colonels traded Mahaffey and Manny Leaks to the New York Nets for Oliver Darden and Andy Anderson.

On June 12, 1969, the Nets traded Mahaffey to the Carolina Cougars in return for a draft pick. Mahaffey played with the Cougars through the 1971–72 season.

Mahaffey appeared in the 1968 ABA Playoffs with the Colonels and in the 1970 ABA Playoffs with the Cougars.  He averaged 13 points a game in the 1968 playoffs and 12 points a game in the 1970 playoffs, but both of his teams exited after the first round.  The Colonels were edged 3 games to 2 by the Minnesota Muskies in the 1968 Eastern Division Semifinals and the Cougars were ousted in the 1970 Eastern Division Semifinals by the Indiana Pacers, 4 games to 0.

Mahaffey averaged 11.9 points per game and 8.0 rebounds per game in his professional basketball career.

References

External links
Basketball-Reference.com Mahaffey statistics

1945 births
Living people
American men's basketball players
Basketball players from Georgia (U.S. state)
Carolina Cougars players
Clemson Tigers men's basketball players
Kentucky Colonels draft picks
Kentucky Colonels players
Los Angeles Lakers draft picks
New York Nets players
Power forwards (basketball)
Small forwards